The 1932 San Diego mayoral election was held on April 26, 1932 to elect the mayor for San Diego. Incumbent mayor Walter W. Austin did not stand for reelection. In the primary election, John F. Forward Jr. and William E. Harper received the most votes and advanced to a runoff election. Forward was then elected mayor with a majority of the votes in the runoff.

Candidates
John F. Forward Jr.
William E. Harper
James V. Alexander
David L. Rosco
Flemmer Adams
C. Leon De Aryan
Francis Von Hassler

Campaign
Incumbent Mayor Walter W. Austin did not stand for reelection. On March 22, 1932, John F. Forward Jr. came in first in the primary election with 47.0 percent of the votes, followed by William E. Harper in second place with 20.9 percent. Since no candidate received a majority of the vote, Forward and Harper advanced to a runoff election. On April 26, 1932, Forward came in first place in the runoff election with 81.8 percent of the vote and was elected to the office of the mayor.

Primary Election results

General Election results

References

1932
1932 California elections
1932 United States mayoral elections
1932
April 1932 events